The Men's 105 kg event at the 2010 South American Games was held over March 29 at 18:00.

Medalists

Results

New Records

References
Final

105kg M